The Satin Woman is a 1927 American silent drama film directed by Walter Lang and starring Dorothy Davenport, also known as Mrs. Wallace Reid. The film is preserved in the Library of Congress collection.

Cast
 Dorothy Davenport as Mrs. Jean Taylor (credited as Mrs. Wallace Reid)
 Rockliffe Fellowes as George Taylor
 Alice White as Jean Taylor Jr.
 John Miljan as Maurice
 Laska Winter as Maria 
 Charles A. Post as Monsieur Francis (credited as Charles 'Buddy' Post)
 Ruth Stonehouse as Claire
 Gladys Brockwell as Mae
 Ethel Wales as 'Countess' Debris

References

External links

1927 films
1927 drama films
Silent American drama films
American silent feature films
1920s English-language films
American black-and-white films
Films directed by Walter Lang
Gotham Pictures films
1920s American films
English-language drama films